The AeroLites AeroMaster AG is an American homebuilt agricultural aircraft, designed and produced by AeroLites of Welsh, Louisiana. The aircraft is supplied as a kit for amateur construction.

Design and development
The AeroMaster AG features a strut-braced mid-wing, a single-seat open cockpit with a windshield, fixed conventional landing gear and a single engine in tractor configuration.

The aircraft fuselage is made from welded 4130 steel tubing, while the wing is bolted-together aluminum, with its flying surfaces covered in Dacron sailcloth envelopes.

The aerial application system is a SprayMiser CDA Ag system with a  chemical tank.

The manufacturer estimates the construction time from the supplied kit as 170 hours.

Operational history
By 1998 the company reported that six kits had been sold and four aircraft were flying.

In November 2013 three examples were registered in the United States with the Federal Aviation Administration.

Specifications (AeroMaster AG)

References

External links

AeroMaster AG
Single-engined tractor aircraft
Mid-wing aircraft
Homebuilt aircraft
1990s United States agricultural aircraft